Coffee drinks are made by brewing water with ground coffee beans. The brewing is either done slowly by drip, filter, French press, cafetière or percolator, or done very quickly under pressure by an espresso machine. When put under the pressure of an espresso machine, the coffee is termed espresso while slow-brewed coffees are generally termed brewed coffee. While all coffee drinks are based on either coffee or espresso, some drinks add milk or cream, some are made with steamed milk or non-dairy milks, or add water (like the americano). Upon milk additions, coffee's flavor can vary with different syrups or sweeteners, alcoholic liqueurs, and even combinations of coffee with espresso or tea. There are many variations to the basic coffee or espresso bases.

With the invention of the Gaggia machine, espresso, and espresso with milk such as cappuccino and latte, spread in popularity from Italy to the UK in the 1950s. It then came to America, and with the rise in popularity of the Italian coffee culture in the 1980s it began to spread worldwide via coffeehouses and coffeehouse chains.

The caffeine content in coffee beans may be reduced via one of several decaffeination processes to produce decaffeinated coffee, also known as decaf, which may be served as regular, espresso or instant coffee.

Infused

Drip or filtered 

Drip-brewed, or filtered coffee, is brewed by hot water passing slowly over roasted, ground coffee beans contained in a filter. Water seeps through the ground coffee, absorbing its oils, flavours and essences as it passes through the filter. The used coffee grounds remain in the filter as the liquid slowly drips into a collecting vessel, such as a carafe or pot.

Paper coffee filters were invented in Germany by Melitta Bentz in 1908. To reduce waste, some coffee drinkers use fine wire mesh filters, which can be re-used for years. Many countries in Latin America and Africa, traditionally, prepare drip coffee using a small reusable bag made of cotton or other cloth.

French press or cafetière

A French press, also known as a press pot, coffee press, coffee plunger, cafetière (UK) or cafetière à piston, is a coffee brewing device patented by Italian designer Attilio Calimani in 1929. A French press requires a coarser grind of coffee than a drip brew coffee filter, as finer grounds will seep through the press filter and into the coffee.

After approximately four minutes the plunger is pressed to separate the grounds and hold them at the bottom of the beaker, then the coffee is poured. Coffee press users have different preferences for how long to wait before pressing the plunger, with some enthusiasts preferring to wait longer than four minutes.

Cold brew

Flash brew 

Flash brewing is another Japanese style of cold coffee brewing. It is similar to drip coffee, as it involves pouring hot water over ground coffee contained in a filter. In this method, a smaller amount of hot water is used and the coffee is dripped directly over ice which immediately cools the coffee down. Unlike cold brewing – another cold coffee method – flash brewed coffee preserves the flavor and acidity that is characteristic of hot drip coffee. Because of this, flash brew coffee is well suited for lighter roasts of coffee, chosen for their unique and complex flavors. In many coffeeshops and coffee chains, iced coffee is made by taking hot coffee and adding ice, which waters down the coffee over time. Flash brewing works around this issue.

Boiled

Percolated

A coffee percolator is a type of pot used to brew coffee by continually cycling the boiling water through the grounds using gravity until the required coffee strength is reached. There are stove-top percolators and standalone units which contain a built-in heating element. Percolators were popular until the 1970s, when they were widely replaced with other techniques. By the mid-1970s, many companies ceased production of percolators.

Turkish 

Beans for Turkish coffee are ground to a fine powder. Turkish coffee is prepared by immersing the coffee grounds in water and heating until it just boils. This method produces the maximum amount of foam. If the coffee is left to boil longer, less foam remains. In Turkey, four degrees of sweetness are used. The Turkish terms and approximate amounts are as follows: sade (plain; no sugar), az şekerli (little sugar; half a level teaspoon of sugar), orta şekerli (medium sugar; one level teaspoon), şekerli or çok şekerli (high sugar; two or three teaspoons). Before boiling, the coffee and the desired amount of sugar are stirred until all coffee sinks and the sugar is dissolved. If the coffee is stirred longer (until the foam forming ir up ti the boiling), less or no foam remains. The Turkish term for this kind of coffee is köpüksüz (no foam).

Turkish coffee is an Intangible Cultural Heritage of Turkey confirmed by UNESCO.

Moka

Moka coffee is coffee brewed with a moka pot, a stovetop coffee maker which produces coffee by passing hot water pressurized by steam through ground coffee at a lower pressure than an espresso maker. The moka pot is an Italian invention, first produced by Bialetti in the early 1930s. The flavor of moka coffee depends greatly on bean variety, roast level, fineness of grind, and the level of heat used. Due to the higher-than-atmospheric pressure involved, the mixture of water and steam reaches temperatures well above , causing a more efficient extraction of caffeine and flavors from the grounds, and resulting in a stronger brew than that obtained by drip brewing.

Kopi kothok
 is made by boiling coffee grounds and sugar together in a pot or a saucepan. It is very common in Cepu and Bojonegoro.
The ratio of coffee grounds and sugar is generally one to two. A 1:1 ratio for more bitter coffee drinks. Milk also can be added according to the order before boiling the coffee grounds.

Vacuum coffee

A vacuum coffee maker brews coffee using two chambers where vapor pressure and vacuum produce coffee. This type of coffee maker is also known as vac pot, siphon or syphon coffee maker, and was invented by Loeff of Berlin in the 1830s. These devices have since been used for more than a century in many parts of the world and more recently have been given a new use by bartenders and chefs to make hot cocktails and broths.

Espresso

Espresso is brewed by machine, forcing a small amount of nearly boiling water and steam – about  – under pressure through finely ground and compacted coffee. The espresso machine was patented in 1901 from an earlier 1884 machine, and developed in Italy; with the invention of the Gaggia machine, espresso spread in popularity to the UK in the 1950s where it was more often drunk with milk as cappuccino due to the influence of the British milk bars, then America in the 1980s where again it was mainly drunk with milk, and then via coffeehouse chains it spread worldwide. Espresso is generally denser than coffee brewed by other methods, having a higher concentration of suspended and dissolved solids; it generally has a creamy foam on top known as crema. Espresso is the base for a number of other coffee drinks, such as latte, cappuccino, macchiato, mocha, and americano.

Combinations

Coffee with milk

Coffee with condensed milk 

Café bombón was made popular in Valencia, Spain, and spread gradually to the rest of the country. It might have been re-created and modified to suit European tastebuds as in many parts of Asia such as Malaysia, Thailand, Vietnam and Singapore. The same recipe for coffee which is called Kopi Susu Panas (Malaysia) or Gafeh Rorn [lit: hot coffee] (Thailand) has already been around for decades and is very popular in mamak stalls and kopitiams in Malaysia. A café bombón, however, uses espresso served with sweetened condensed milk in a 1:1 ratio whereas the Asian version uses ground coffee and sweetened condensed milk at the same ratio. On the Canary Islands a variety named café proprio or largo condensada is served using the same amount of condensed milk but a "café largo" or espresso lungo. For café bombón, the condensed milk is added to the espresso. For visual effect, a glass is used, and the condensed milk is added slowly to sink underneath the coffee and create two separate bands of contrasting colour – though these layers are customarily stirred together before consumption. Some establishments merely serve an espresso with a sachet of condensed milk for patrons to make themselves.

Coffee with coconut milk 
There is a coffee drink combined with coconut milk from Blora, Indonesia. It is called kopi santen (Javanese) or kopi santan (Indonesian). Formulated for the first time in 1980 by a grandmother named Sakijah.

Slow-brewed and espresso 

Regular coffee (slow brewed as with a filter or cafetière) is sometimes combined with espresso to increase either the intensity of the flavour or the caffeine content. This may be called a variety of names, most commonly red eye, or shot in the dark. Coffeehouse chains may have their own names, such as turbo at Dunkin' Donuts. and depth charge – a federally registered trademark of Caribou Coffee. At Starbucks, a double shot of espresso in the coffee may be termed a "black eye", and a triple shot a "dead eye". "Caffè Tobio" is a version with an equal amount of coffee to espresso.

Coffee with tea

 Black tie is a drink made by mixing traditional Thai iced tea, which is a spicy and sweet mixture of chilled black tea, orange blossom water, star anise, crushed tamarind, sugar and condensed milk or cream, with a double shot of espresso.
 Numerous houses use the term chai latte to indicate that the steamed milk of a normal caffè latte is being flavoured with a spiced tea concentrate instead of with espresso. Spiced chai (aka by the redundant term "chai tea") with a single shot of espresso. In addition, 1–2 tablespoons of instant espresso may be brewed while simultaneously steeping chai in the same container; a small amount of a dairy or non-dairy drink of choice is usually added to complete the drink.
 Red tie is a drink made by mixing traditional Thai iced tea, which is a spicy and sweet mixture of chilled black tea, orange blossom water, star anise, crushed tamarind, sugar and condensed milk or cream, with a single shot of espresso.
 Yuenyeung is a popular drink in Hong Kong, made of a mixture of coffee and Hong Kong-style milk tea. It was originally served at dai pai dongs (open space food vendors) and cha chaan tengs (cafe), but is now available in various types of restaurants. It can be served hot or cold. The name yuanyang, which refers to mandarin ducks, is a symbol of conjugal love in Chinese culture, as the birds usually appear in pairs and the male and female look very different. This same connotation of "pair" of two unlike items is used to name this drink.

Liqueur coffee

A liqueur coffee is a coffee brew with a  shot of liqueur. This brew is usually served in a clear liqueur coffee glass with the coffee and cream separated for visual and taste effect. The liqueur of choice is added first with a teaspoon of sugar mixed in. The glass is then filled to within  of the top with filtered coffee. Slightly whipped cream may then be poured over the back of a spoon, so that it floats on top of the coffee and liqueur mixture. The sugar is required in the coffee mixture to help the cream float.

The caffeine content of these drinks, to the extent that caffeine is present in them, will not prevent intoxication from their alcohol content. Instead, the caffeine may mask the true degree of ethanol-induced loss of coordination.

 Barraquito is an old drink from Tenerife combining espresso, condensed sweetened milk, foamed milk, lemon, cinnamon and Licor 43, which was carried across the Atlantic in a later modified form as the Carajillo.  
 Caffè corretto (that is an Italian drink, consists of a shot of espresso "corrected" with a shot of liquor, usually grappa, brandy or sambuca.)
 Ponce, a hot drink, akin to tea grog (the name itself is a calque of punch) originating in Leghorn port: a shot of espresso poured on top of rum made hot with the espresso machine steamer. A lemon zest is often added. 
 A carajillo is a Spanish drink combining coffee with brandy, whisky, anisette, or rum. It is typical of Spain and according to folk etymology, its origin dates to the Spanish occupation of Cuba. The troops combined coffee with rum to give them courage (coraje in Spanish, hence "corajillo" and more recently "carajillo"). There are many different ways of making a carajillo, ranging from black coffee with the spirit simply poured in to heating the spirit with lemon, sugar and cinnamon and adding the coffee last. A similar Italian drink is known as caffè corretto.
 Hasseltse koffie, Vlaamse koffie or Afzakkertje (coffee with Hasseltse jenever).
 Hotshot is a Swedish shot with 1 part Galliano, 1 part coffee and 1 part heavy cream.
 Irish coffee
 Karsk, kaffegök or svartkopp (coffee with moonshine)
 Rüdesheimer Kaffee is an alcoholic coffee drink from Rüdesheim in Germany invented in 1957 by Hans Karl Adam. It is made with Asbach Uralt brandy with coffee and sugar, and is topped with whipped cream.
 A Pharisäer, meaning a Pharisee, is an alcoholic coffee drink that is popular in the Nordfriesland district of Germany. It consists of a mug of black coffee, a double shot of rum, and a topping of whipped cream. In 1981, a court in Flensburg ruled that  of rum were not sufficient for preparing a genuine Pharisäer.
 A gunfire has its origins in the British Army, typically made by mixing black tea with rum, though in Australia and New Zealand it is more often made with black coffee instead. On ANZAC Day, this version is served to soldiers before dawn services as part of the "gunfire breakfast".

Flavoured

Melya
Melya is coffee flavoured with cocoa powder and honey. Cream is sometimes added.

Caffè Marocchino
The marocchino is made from espresso, steamed milk, and a dusting of cocoa powder, similar to the espressino.

Café miel
A café miel has a shot of espresso, steamed milk, cinnamon, and honey. The name comes from the Spanish word for honey, miel.

Mocha or café mocha or mochaccino

A café mocha is a variant of a caffè latte. Like a latte, it is typically one third espresso and two thirds steamed milk, but a portion of chocolate is added, typically in the form of a chocolate syrup, although other vending systems use instant chocolate powder. Mochas can contain dark or milk chocolate.

The term moccaccino is used in some regions of Europe and the Middle East to describe caffè latte with cocoa or chocolate. In the U.S. it usually refers to a cappuccino made with chocolate.

A cafe borgia is a mocha with orange rind and sometimes orange flavoring added. Often served with whipped cream and topped with cinnamon.

Café de olla
Café de olla or pot coffee is a traditional coffee-based drink prepared using earthen clay pots or jars in Mexico and other Latin American countries. It is flavored with cinnamon and piloncillo. Consumed primarily in colder weathers, usually with the merienda meal, and accompanied with pan dulce pastries.

Café rápido y sucio
A café rápido y sucio, or a quick & dirty coffee, is three shots of espresso topped with chocolate or mocha syrup.  Unlike a café mocha which has milk added or an Americano which has water added, a Café Rápido y Sucio or a Quick & Dirty Coffee is espresso and chocolate only.  Any variation of this drink containing more than three shots of espresso would be referred to as a Fast & Filthy Coffee.

'Two Guys Praline coffee' which is a creation of the short lived Two Guys from Brussels café in Bangor, Gwynedd.

Miscellaneous
Some coffeehouses provide flavoured syrups which customers can have added to their coffee drinks. Some non-dairy creamers have flavoured versions, such as hazelnut flavour and Irish Cream flavour (the latter is non-alcoholic).

Pedrocchi or Paduan Coffee
A mint coffee that originated from the city of Padua in the Caffè Pedrocchi. It is indeed known in Padua as Pedrocchi; while in the rest of Italy as Caffè Padovano, which can be translated as Paduan Coffee. It is made of a lower layer of hot espresso coffee, a middle thick layer of fresh cream and mint syrup, and an upper thin layer of cocoa powder. The beverage is not to be stirred nor added with sugar.

Iced

Frappé 

Greek frappé (Café frappé), sometimes called a javaccino by independent coffeehouses, is a foam-covered iced coffee drink made from spray-dried instant coffee. It is very popular in Greece especially during summer, but has now spread on to other countries.

There are numerous ways in which this coffee can be tailored to the individual's taste, such as: all water-no milk; half-half; all milk and; varying levels of sweetness. Frappe is also extremely popular in Cyprus where fresh milk is used as opposed to condensed.
In French, when describing a drink, the word frappé means shaken or chilled; however, in popular Greek culture, the word frappé is predominantly taken to refer to the shaking associated with the preparation of a café frappé.

Greek Freddo preparations

Freddo espresso 

Freddo espresso is a foam-topped iced coffee made from espresso that is commonplace in Greece. It consists of two shots of espresso, sugar (granules or syrup), and ice 1:2 ( espresso shots:ice). The espresso is mixed with the sugar and ice in a frapièra (a drink mixer), which cools the espresso and produces a foam from the oils of the coffee. This mixture is then poured over ice into a serving glass.

Freddo cappuccino 

Freddo cappuccino is another variation of the original cappuccino and is as popular as the freddo espresso. It follows the same process as the freddo espresso, but is topped with a cold milk froth called  which is added in ratio 1:2 (espresso shots:milk), and 1:2 (espresso shots:ice). The choice of milk used to create the afrógala may vary from fresh to condensed. Recently the Coffee Island coffee shop (a coffee shop franchise in Greece), established a new foam and cream trend in freddo cappuccino. They use plant based milk creamed in the frapièra. The result is a stiffer and sweeter cream.

Other 

 Mazagran
 Mazagran (sometimes misspelled as Mazagrin) is a cold coffee drink that originated in Algeria. It is typically served in a tall glass, and is made with coffee and ice. Sometimes sugar, rum, lemon or water is added. Sometimes a fast version is achieved by pouring a previously sweetened espresso in a cup with ice cubes and a slice of lemon.
 Palazzo
 A Palazzo is an iced coffee variant, popular in Southern California. It is two shots of espresso, chilled immediately after brewing and mixed with sweetened cream. A Palazzo is typically made using a moka pot.
 Ice shot
 Originating in Australia and similar to the Mazagran, the minimal ice shot is a single shot of fresh espresso poured into an ordinary latté glass that has been filled with ice. The hot coffee, in melting some of the ice is diluted, re-freezing to a granita-like texture. The addition of a single scoop of ice-cream on top is a popular variant. No milk, sugar, extra flavouring or cream are involved.
 Shakerato
 Shakerato is an iced coffee made by shaking espresso and ice cubes.

Instant coffee

Instant coffee is a drink derived from brewed coffee beans. Through various manufacturing processes the coffee is dehydrated into the form of powder or granules. These can be rehydrated with hot water to provide a drink similar (though not identical) to conventional coffee. At least one brand of instant coffee, Camp Coffee, is also available in concentrated liquid form.

Instant coffee is used as an ingredient in other coffee drinks. Indian beaten coffee is made from instant coffee whipped with sugar and served over warm milk. A Korean drink known as dalgona coffee is prepared similarly, but can be served hot or cold. A Greek frappé coffee is made again from instant coffee, sugar, and milk, but it is prepared in a cocktail shaker.

Instant coffee brands include:
 UCC
 Chock full o'Nuts
 Folgers
 Kenco
 Lavazza
 Maxwell House
 Moccona
 Mr. Brown Coffee
 Nescafé
 Sanka

Decaffeinated 

A decaffeination process removes caffeine from coffee beans to lower their caffeine content. Four main methods are used to extract caffeine from coffee beans:
 Soaking the beans in water, a method said to have been developed in Switzerland
 Washing beans in a solution of water and ethyl acetate
 Applying carbon dioxide, either as a liquid or in a supercritical state, to beans at high pressure
 Dissolving the caffeine with the solvent dichloromethane
Decaffeinated coffee grew in popularity over the last half of the 20th century, mainly due to health concerns that arose regarding the over-consumption of caffeine. Decaffeinated coffee, sometimes known as "decaf", may be drunk as regular brewed coffee, instant, espresso, or as a mix of regular caffeine beans and decaffeinated beans.

Other

Affogato al caffè

An affogato (Italian for "drowned") is vanilla gelato with hot espresso poured over it. Affogato style, which refers to the act of topping a drink or dessert with espresso, may also incorporate caramel sauce or chocolate sauce. When ordered, an affogato tends to be served with scoops of ice cream with a shot (or 2) of espresso poured over the top, sometimes mixed with a liqueur. A white affogato is the same as a regular affogato, just with milk added.

Babyccino 

A babyccino is frothed up milk and warm milk in an espresso cup prepared for young children, a cappuccino for babies. The split should be about 80% foam and 20% warm milk with a sprinkling of cacao powder on top. The drink originated in Sydney, Australia, in the late 1980s by the famed Zigolini's coffee house.

Caffè Medici

A caffè Medici is a doppio poured over chocolate syrup and orange peel, usually topped with whipped cream. The drink originated at Seattle's historic Last Exit on Brooklyn coffeehouse.

Café Touba

Café Touba is the spiritual drink of Senegal, named after Cheik Ahmadou Bamba Mbacké (known as Serigne Touba) and the holy city of Touba in Senegal. During the roasting process, the coffee beans are mixed with grains of selim, and sometimes other spices, and ground into powder after roasting. The drink is prepared using a filter, similar to plain coffee. Sugar is often added before drinking.

Canned coffee

Canned coffee is ubiquitous in Japan and throughout East Asia, with a large number of companies competing fiercely and offering various types for sale. Canned coffee is already brewed and ready to drink. It is available in supermarkets and convenience stores, with vast numbers of cans being sold in vending machines that offer heated cans in the autumn and winter, and cold cans in the warm months.

Some brands in the United States have recently begun selling similar products in gas stations, grocery stores, and corner stores, though it is not nearly as widespread as the Japanese version is in Japan. Brands of canned coffee include these:
 UCC
 Folgers
 Mr. Brown Coffee

Coffee milk

Coffee milk is sold in two ways: prepared coffee milk and coffee syrup. It is a drink prepared or made by adding a sweetened coffee concentrate called coffee syrup to milk in a manner similar to chocolate milk. It is the official drink of Rhode Island in the United States. Coffee milk brands include:
 Farmers Union Iced Coffee (Australia) marketed as iced coffee
 Autocrat, LLC

It is popular in South Australia where it is known as iced coffee but that should not be confused with the drink of the same name made from coffee with ice but without milk or with little milk that is popular in the United States and other countries

Double-double

Double-double is a uniquely Canadian term that is strongly associated with Tim Hortons. It consists of a cup of drip coffee with two creams and two sugars (or double cream, double sugar).  The chain achieves flavor consistency across cup sizes by employing a pair of countertop vending machines, one dispensing cream and the other dispensing sugar, with a button for each of the four cup sizes. The terms "single-single" or "regular" and "triple-triple", though not as common as the "double-double", refer to coffee with one and three shots of sugar and cream, respectively. The coffee is always poured over the cream and sugar, important to achieve the correct flavour. Other combinations include a "Four by Four" and a "Wayne Gretzky" (8 cream, 8 sugar).

Egg coffee

Egg coffee (Vietnamese: Cà phê trứng) is a Vietnamese drink from Hanoi with thick texture traditionally prepared with egg yolks, sugar, condensed milk and drip coffee.

Indian filter coffee

South Indian coffee, also known as Madras filter coffee, Kumbakonam degree coffee, Mylapore filter coffee, Mysore filter coffee, Palakkad Iyer coffee or South Indian Filter Coffee (Kaapi) or kaapi (South Indian phonetic rendering of "coffee") is a sweet milky coffee made from dark roasted coffee beans (70–80%) and chicory (20–30%), especially popular in the southern states of Andhra Pradesh, Karnataka, Kerala and Tamil Nadu. The most commonly used coffee beans are Koffeey Arabica (Coffee Arabica grown from Arehalli Village) Peaberry (preferred), Arabica, Malabar and Robusta grown in the hills of Karnataka (Kodagu, Chikkamagaluru), Kerala (Malabar region) and Tamil Nadu (Nilgiris District, Yercaud and Kodaikanal).

Pocillo

A shot or small portion of unsweetened coffee, now usually made either using an espresso machine or a moka pot, but traditionally made using a cloth drip, usually served in cups made for the purpose, called "tacitas de pocillo". It is widely drunk in Latin America, usually as an afternoon or after-dinner coffee. The defining feature is the size, usually half to a quarter the size of the usual ~ coffee cups. There are a number of small-sized drinks that use tacitas de pocillo, including such sweetened varieties as café cubano and café cortado, but these are usually not called a pocillo; rather, the Spanish diminutive suffix "-ito" is usually added to the name of the drink wanted in a pocillo size cup. For example, a pocillo-sized cortado is usually called a cortadito.

See also

 List of coffee dishes
 Coffee substitute
 Coffee preparation

References

External links
 

 
Coffee beverages